Aasai Mugam is a 1965 Indian Tamil-language film starring M. G. Ramachandran, inspired by The Man Who Knew Too Much. The film was released on 10 December 1965.

Plot 

Because Ponniyam Kodhi, a marriage broker feels deceived on his commission by Bhavani Amma, the mother of Selvi, whom she is soon going to marry to a strong good match, attractive Manohar, the only son of big family, that of Siva Shankaran Pulai, an immense landowner, the matchmaker, out of revenge, damages the engagement. At the same moment, somewhere else, a gang led by Varada, the ex-manager of Siva Shankaran Pulai's domains plans with his walk-on a ruffian Vajravel, to appropriate all the fortune of his former boss, by usurping the identity of his son and more exactly, the face of Manohar. The affair is facilitated by a mysterious doctor and by a machine of his invention. Entranced by greed, Vajravel volunteers to undergo an operation of plastic surgery to look like his victim Manohar.

Cast 
 M. G. Ramachandran as Manohar, Vajravel and Burma Chitappa Ramalingam
 B. Saroja Devi as Selvi
 M. N. Nambiar as Varatha, alias Varathan
 Nagesh as Sankara, Manohar's secretary 
 K. D. Santhanam as Sivasankaran Pillai
 S. V. Ramadas as Vajravel
 K. R. Ramsingh as the plastic surgeon
 "Loose" Aarumugham
 Geethanjali as Kamala
 Lakshmi Prabha as Maragatham
 C. K. Saraswathi as Bhavani
Karikol Raju as Varatha's henchman

Production 
The film was inspired by the 1934 and 1956 film versions of the novel The Man Who Knew Too Much. It was initially titled Ellam Arintha Manithan, but Ramachandran objected as he felt it was "too pompous" and "big". He suggested Aasai Mugam, and that was chosen. K. P. Ramakrishnan served as Ramachandran's body double.

Soundtrack 
The music was composed by S. M. Subbaiah Naidu, with lyrics written by Vaali.

Release and reception 
Aasai Mugam was released on 10 December 1965. T. M. Ramachandran of Sport and Pastime wrote "The film moves in such a fast manner that it sustains the interest of the audience throughout. The deft hand of veteran P. Pulliah can be seen in every foot of the film". The Indian Express negatively reviewed the film, but praised the performances of Ramachandran and Saroja Devi, despite feeling their roles were not well written. Kalki praised Ramachandran for showing diversity in the three roles he enacted.

References

External links 

1960s Tamil-language films
1965 films
Films directed by P. Pullayya
Films scored by S. M. Subbaiah Naidu